Anthony Campbell (born 25 September 1950) is a Jamaican cricketer. He played in twenty-two first-class and seven List A matches for the Jamaican cricket team from 1969 to 1980.

See also
 List of Jamaican representative cricketers

References

External links
 

1950 births
Living people
Jamaican cricketers
Jamaica cricketers
Cricketers from Kingston, Jamaica